İbimahmut is a village in the Mazgirt District, Tunceli Province, Turkey. The village is populated by Kurds of the Hormek tribe and had a population of 84 in 2021.

The hamlets of Arılar, Devrişler, Karıncalı, Medet, Murat and Ortaklar are attached to the village.

References 

Villages in Mazgirt District
Kurdish settlements in Tunceli Province